Codex Guelferbytanus B designated by Q or 026 (in the Gregory-Aland numbering), ε 4 (von Soden), is a Greek uncial manuscript of the Gospels, dated palaeographically to the 5th century.
It is a palimpsest.

Contents 
Gospel of Luke
4:34-5:4, 6:10-26, 12:6-43, 15:14-31, 17:34-18:15, 18:34-19:11, 19:47-20:17, 20:34-21:8, 22:27-46, 23:30-49;

Gospel of John
12:3-20, 14:3-22.

Description 

The codex contains text of the Gospels in a fragmentary condition on 13 parchment leaves. It is written in two columns per page, 28 lines per column, in large uncial letters. 
The letters Θ, Ε, Ο, Σ being compressed, a departure from the very ancient forms. The text is divided according to the Ammonian Sections, whose numbers are given at the margin, but references to the Eusebian Canons are absent. It is speculated that references to the Eusebian Canons were written in red.

The nomina sacra are written in an abbreviated way. N ephelkystikon occurs (e.g.  in John 12:7).

It is a palimpsest, with many verses illegible. The upper text of the codex is in Latin text Isidore of Seville's (Origins and letters), as in the Codex Guelferbytanus A. The whole book is known as Codex Guelferbytanus 64 Weissenburgensis.

Text 

The Greek text of this codex is a representative of the Byzantine text-type, with a number (about 20%) of an alien readings (usually Alexandrian), which stand in a close agreement with the later Alexandrian witnesses L, 33, 579). According to Kurt and Barbara Aland it agrees 5 times with the Byzantine text against the original, it does not support original text against the Byzantine, it agrees with both 5 times. It has 2 independent or distinctive readings. Alands placed it in Category V.

According to the Claremont Profile Method it has mixed text in Luke 20.

According to Scrivener the codex agrees with codices AB united 50 times, sides with B against A 38 times, accords with A against B in 75 places.

In John 12:4 it reads ;

 John 12:5 
 John 12:6  omitted
 John 12:6 
 John 12:7 
 John 12:9 
 John 12:12 ο ] omitted
 John 12:13 
 John 12:16 
 John 12:19 
 John 12:19

History 

The manuscript was discovered in the 18th century by Franz Anton Knittel (1721–1792) in the Ducal Library of Wolfenbüttel.

The history of the codex is linked with Guelferbytanus A. It was examined, collated, and edited by Constantin von Tischendorf. The codex is located in Wolfenbüttel Herzog August Bibliothek (Weissenburg 64).

See also 

 List of New Testament uncials
 Textual criticism
 Codex Carolinus

References

Further reading 

 Constantin von Tischendorf, Monumenta sacra inedita III (Leipzig, 1860), pp. 263–291.
 U. B. Schmid, D. C. Parker, W. J. Elliott, The Gospel According to St. John: The Majuscules (Brill 2007), pp. 45–51. [text of the codex in the Gospel of John]

External links 
 Codex Guelferbytanus B Q (026): at the Encyclopedia of Textual Criticism
 Digitalized Codex Guelferbytanus 64 Weissenburgensis at the Wolfenbütteler Digitalen Bibliothek

Greek New Testament uncials
5th-century biblical manuscripts
Palimpsests
Herzog August Library